On December 11, 1941, in response to the Italian declaration of war on the United States, four days following the Japanese surprise attack on Pearl Harbor, and three days after the United States declaration of war on the Empire of Japan, the United States Congress passed the Joint Resolution Declaring That a State of War Exists Between The Government of Italy and the Government and the People of the United States and Making Provisions to Prosecute the Same, thereby declaring war against Italy. It also declared war upon Germany that same day. The vote was 90-0 in the Senate and 399-0 in the House.

Text of the declaration

See also
 Arcadia Conference
 Declarations of war during World War II
 Diplomatic history of World War II
Kellogg–Briand Pact
 United States declaration of war on Japan
 United States declaration of war upon Germany (1941)

References 

1941 in international relations
1941 in Italy
1941 in the United States
Declarations of war during World War II
Italy
December 1941 events
Italy–United States military relations
1941 documents